This is a list of notable professional wrestlers and personalities that performed in the different incarnations of the Pacific Northwest Wrestling promotion from:

1925–1992 (as Don Owen Sports)
1992–1997 (as Championship Wrestling USA)

They are listed in alphabetical order of their ring name.

Wrestlers

A
Brian Adams Demolition Crush
Chris Adams
Adrian Adonis (Keith Franke)
André the Giant
Bryan Alvarez
Cuban Assassin

B
Art Barr (aka Beetlejuice)
Jesse Barr
Sandy Barr
C. W. Bergstrom
Brady Boone (Dean Peters)
Tony Borne (Tony Osborne)
Matt Borne (Matt Osborne)
Johnathan Boyd (Barry Boyle)
Bruiser Brody (Frank Goodish)
Killer Brooks (Tim Brooks)

C
Haystacks Calhoun (William Calhoun)

D
Colonel DeBeers / Mega Maharishi (Edward Wiskowski)
The Destroyer (Dick Beyer)
Steve Doll
The Dynamite Kid (Thomas Billington)

E
Paul Ellering
Eric Embry
The Equalizer (Bill Dannenhauser)

F
Ric Flair (Richard Fliehr)
Mr. Fuji (Harry Fujiwara)
Ron Fuller

G
Superstar Billy Graham (Eldridge Wayne Coleman)
The Grappler (Len Denton)
Chavo Guerrero (Salvádor Guerrero Llanes)
Gory Guerrero (Salvádor Guerrero Quésada)
Mando Guerrero

H
Billy Jack Haynes (William Haynes, Jr.)
Curt Hennig
Larry Hennig
Dizzy Hogan (Edward Leslie)
Johnathan Holliday

J
Don Leo Jonathan (Don Heaton)
Rocky Johnson (Wayde Bowles)

K
Gene Kiniski
Nick Kiniski

M
Taylor Made (Terri Poch)
Al Madril
Magnum T. A. (Terry Allen)
Rick Martel (Richard Vigneault)
Mil Máscaras
Moondog Mayne
Bugsy McGraw (Michael Davis)
Velvet McIntyre
Butch Miller (Robert Miller)
"Mean" Mike Miller
Gorilla Monsoon (Robert James "Gino" Marella)
Pedro Morales

N
Kendo Nagasaki
Nord The Barbarian (John Nord)
Scott Norton

O
Rip Oliver†

P
Iceman Parsons (King Parsons)
Pat Patterson
Roddy Piper (Roderick Toombs)
Tom Prichard

R
Harley Race
Bull Ramos
Steve Regal
Rip Rogers (Mark Sciarra)
Tommy Rogers (Thomas Couch)
Buddy Rose (Paul Perschmann)
Irish Paddy Ryan (Earl Patrick Freeman)

S
Coco Samoa
Dutch Savage (Frank Stewart)
Joe Savoldi
Bart Sawyer (Steven Stewart)
Brett Sawyer (Brett Woyan)
Buzz Sawyer (Bruce Woyan)
David Schultz
Scotty The Body [Raven](Scott Levy)
Steve Simpson (Steve Cohen)
Tiger Jeet Singh (Jagjit Singh)
Sgt. Slaughter (Robert Remus)
Jimmy Snuka (James Reiher)
Doug Somers
Stan Stasiak (George Stipich)
Jules Strongbow (Frank Hill)

T
Chris Taylor
Shag Thomas

V
Greg Valentine (John Wisniski, Jr.)
Jesse Ventura (James Janos)

W
Luke Williams (Brian Wickens)
Bearcat Wright (Edward Wright)

Y
Jay Youngblood (Steven Romero)

Z
Tom Zenk
Buck Zumhofe (Herman Zumhofe)

Tag teams
Jesse & Art Barr
Bruise Brothers 
Buzz & Brett Sawyer 
Larry & Curt Hennig
Latin Connection (Ricky Santana & Al Madril)
Juice Patrol (Beatlejuice & Big Juice)
Kiwi Sheepherders 
Matt Borne & Steve Regal
The Clan (wrestling stable led by Rip Oliver)
Southern Rockers (Steve Doll & Scott Peterson & Rex King)
S&S Express (Steve Simpson & Joe Savoldi)
U.S. Male (Ricky Santana & Curtis Thompson)

Lists of professional wrestling personnel
Alumni